Donga Sachinollu is a Telugu film, directed by Raja Vannemreddy and produced by J. Sambhasiva Rao and Ch SV Prasad under Shashidhar Productions. The film was released in March 2008.

The movie launch function was held on 22 October 2007. Muhurat shot was clapped by Dasari Narayana Rao, the camera was switched on by Mohan Babu and the first shot was directed by Rama Naidu. The film also marked actress Rambha's last Telugu film to date (before marriage and retirement from films)!

Cast
Krishna Bhagavan as Kamudu 
Raghu Babu as Ramudu 
Rambha as Kavya 
Chandra Mohan
Telangana Shakuntala
Vinod Kumar
Ali
Brahmanandam
Dharmavarapu Subramanyam
M. S. Narayana
Venu Madhav
Pragathi
Rallapalli

References

External links
Movie Launch

2008 films
2000s Telugu-language films